Newton Downtown Historic District may refer to:

 Newton Downtown Historic District (Newton, Iowa)
 Newton Downtown Historic District (Newton, North Carolina)